Robert Saunders (January 22, 1929 – October 23, 2016) was an American politician in the state of Florida.

Saunders was born in Quitman, Georgia and came to Florida in 1938. He served in the Florida State Senate from 1969 to 1971, as well as 1973 to 1976. He was a member of the Democratic Party. He owned several gas stations, cemeteries, and a funeral home. Saunders died at his home on October 23, 2016, at the age of 87.

References

1929 births
2016 deaths
Democratic Party Florida state senators
People from Quitman, Georgia
People from Gainesville, Florida
Businesspeople from Florida
20th-century American businesspeople